Stavanger Aftenblad (lit: Stavanger Evening Paper) or simply Aftenbladet is a daily newspaper based in Stavanger, Norway, and owned by Schibsted Media Group.

Norwegian owners held 42 percent of the shares in Schibsted at the end of 2015. Stavanger Aftenblad is thus majority foreign-owned.

History and profile

Stavanger Aftenblad was founded in 1893 by the priest Lars Oftedal, and was for a long period a publication for the Norwegian Liberal Party. The paper is based in Stavanger and is owned by the Media Norge, a subsidiary of the Schibsted company.

Stavanger Aftenblad has a Christian-conservative stance. The paper went from broadsheet format to tabloid format on 16 September 2006. Its editor-in-chief is Kjersti Sortland.

The online version of Stavanger Aftenblad had an English news service, aimed at the English speaking foreign community in Norway who were not fluent in the language, and international audiences interested in Norway. The English service closed in January 2009 due to the then-ongoing financial crisis.

The circulation of Stavanger Aftenblad was 70,000 copies in 2003. The paper had a  circulation of 68,186 copies in 2005. Its circulation was 65,500 copies in 2009.

See also
List of non-English newspapers with English language subsections

Notes

External links
Stavanger Aftenblad

1893 establishments in Norway
Publications established in 1893
Daily newspapers published in Norway
Norwegian-language newspapers
Mass media in Stavanger